David Etxebarria Alkorta (born 23 July 1973 in Abadiño, Basque Country) is a Spanish former professional road racing cyclist.

Major results

1996
 1st Overall Tour de l'Avenir
 1st GP Llodio
1998
 1st Stage 2 Paris–Nice
1999
 1st Overall Euskal Bizikleta
 Tour de France
1st Stages 12 & 16
2001
 1st Stage 3 Volta a la Comunitat Valenciana
2002
 Tour of the Basque Country
1st Stages 5a & 5b
 1st Stage 4a Euskal Bizikleta
2003
 1st Stage 1 Euskal Bizikleta
2005
 1st Klasika Primavera

Grand Tour general classification results timeline

External links 

Official Tour de France results for David Etxebarria

1973 births
Living people
Cyclists from the Basque Country (autonomous community)
Spanish male cyclists
Spanish Tour de France stage winners
People from Abadiño
Tour de Suisse stage winners
Sportspeople from Biscay